The Mackay Episcopal Church, located at Park Ave. and College in Mackay, Idaho, was built in 1902.  It was listed on the National Register of Historic Places in 1982.

It is an Episcopal church.

It was designed by architects John E. Tourtellotte & Company.

It is a one-story frame building, which is rectangular except for an outset gabled vestry at the left rear.  It has a square belfry and it has shiplap siding.

A contemporary church, the Mackay Methodist Episcopal Church, was built in 1901 and is also NRHP-listed.

References

Churches on the National Register of Historic Places in Idaho
Churches completed in 1902
Custer County, Idaho